is a railway station in the city of  Toyohashi, Aichi Prefecture, Japan, operated by the Public–private partnership Toyohashi Railroad.

Lines
Minami-Sakae Station is a station of the Atsumi Line, and is located 3.2 kilometers from the starting point of the line at Shin-Toyohashi Station.

Station layout
The station has one side platform serving one bi-directional track. The station is staffed.

Adjacent stations

|-
!colspan=5|Toyohashi Railroad

Station history
On September 1, 1940, the Atsumi Railway became part of the Nagoya Railway system, but was spun out into the Toyohashi Railway on October 1, 1954. The station name changed to its present name in January 1947.

Passenger statistics
In fiscal 2017, the station was used by an average of 3732 passengers daily.

Surrounding area
Toyohashi Technical High School

See also
 List of railway stations in Japan

References

External links

Toyohashi Railway Official home page

Railway stations in Aichi Prefecture
Railway stations in Japan opened in 1937
Toyohashi